Edward Joseph de Smedt was a Belgian-American inventor of asphalt concrete.

De Smedt developed his asphalt paving material in 1870 at Columbia University and filed the patents for "sheet asphalt pavement". The first sheet of asphalt pavement was laid down on 29 July 1870, on William Street in Newark, New Jersey. This trial used natural bitumen from West Virginia and was not very successful. An improved material containing bitumen from Pitch Lake in Trinidad and Val-de-Travers in Switzerland, was used later in New York City and on Pennsylvania Avenue in Washington, DC.

References 

American inventors
Year of birth missing
Year of death missing
Belgian inventors
Belgian emigrants to the United States
Columbia University alumni